Manawaiopuna Falls (colloquially known as Jurassic Falls) is a privately owned waterfall in the Hawaiian Islands, located in Hanapepe Valley on Kauai Island. It featured in the background of several scenes in the 1993 Steven Spielberg film Jurassic Park.

The waterfall is only accessible by helicopter. Landing near the falls was forbidden until 2009, after which Island Helicopters was allowed to land a limited number of times per week.

References

Waterfalls of Kauai